Thomas Edward Penard (7 May 1878 – 27 October 1936) was an American engineer and ornithologist who, along with his brothers studied the birds of Surinam. Along with his brothers, he also took and interest in folklore and linguistics in the Caribbean.

Penard was the second child of Dutch merchant Frederik and Philippina Salomons, then settled in Paramaribo, Surinam, a Dutch colony. His older brother Frederik Paul (26 January 1876 – 4 September 1909) and a younger brother Arthur Philip (6 April 1880 – 12 September 1932) who were affected by leprosy from a young age were forced out of school and educated at home. To avoid infection, Thomas and the youngest son William were sent off to the United States of America at the age of thirteen and grew up in Everett, Massachusetts. He graduated from the Massachusetts Institute of Technology with a degree in electrical engineering in 1900 and joined the Edison Electric Illuminating Company in Boston. He later helped establish evening education at the Northeastern University, Boston where he also taught.

Frederik and Arthur who stayed on at home were well known for their ornithological work which they began in 1896, with collections made for them by natives and deposited at their home in Waterkant. The collections and information collation resulted finally in the publication of De Vogels van Guyana (in two volumes published 1908 and 1910). A part of the Surinam collections was sold off to Lord Rothschild and it was used to fund the publication of the first volume. It was their mother who handled correspondence and it was through her that support for the second volume of their book came from the Leiden Museum. They also interacted with Philip Lutley Sclater. Thomas also took an interest in birds from 1918 and his brother Arthur helped him with a collection of nearly 2000 bird skins between 1912 and 1914 which were held by Thomas in Arlington.Thomas collaborated with Outram Bangs to study the birds of Surinam and published several notes. Frederik died before the second volume was made and Arthur later went blind but continued to have notes dictated. Unable in later life to spare enough time from engineering work, Thomas sold off his collections of birds to the Museum of Comparative Zoology in 1930.

Penard married Sabrina Grant in 1905 and they had a son. The subspecies Jacamerops aureus penardi was named in his honour by Bangs.

Publications

References

External links 
 De vogels van Guyana

1878 births
1936 deaths
American ornithologists
Emigrants from Dutch Guiana to the United States